Villano III Jr. (born July 11, 1998) is a Mexican third-generation luchador enmascarado, or masked professional wrestler currently working for Lucha Libre AAA Worldwide (AAA) where he is of the former AAA World Mixed Tag Team Champion with Lady Maravilla. He is the son of Villano III and La Infernal and the grandson of Ray Mendoza. Villano III Jr.'s real name is not a matter of public record, as is often the case with masked wrestlers in Mexico where their private lives are kept a secret from the wrestling fans.

Professional wrestling career
Villano III Jr. made his first appearance under that name in an exhibition match on the undercard of a show honoring his father's 40th wrestling anniversary on February 5, 2012. In subsequent years he won the Mexican State Tag Team Championship with his brother El Hijo del Villano III as well as the Mexican State Trios Championship with his father and his brother.

Lucha Libre AAA Worldwide (2017–present)
In 2017 VIllano III Jr. was one of several young wrestlers who participated in Lucha Libre AAA Worldwide's "a Llave a Gloria" ("The Key to Glory") tournament. The final match of the tournament took place at AAA's Triplemanía XXV show, where Villano III Jr., Angel Mortal Jr. and Tiger Boy lost to Angelikal, El Hijo del Vikingo and The Tigger. Despite the loss Villano III Jr. became a regular for AAA afterwards, competing of several of their major shows such as Héroes Inmortales XI, as well as teaming with La Hiedra to unsuccessfully challenge Big Mami and Nino Hamburgesa for the AAA World Mixed Tag Team Championship.

On March 16, 2019, at AAA's Rey de Reyes, Villano teamed up with Lady Maravilla for the AAA World Mixed Tag Team Championship against Niño Hamburguesa and Big Mami, where Hamburgesa and Mami managed to retain their titles. On August 3, at Triplemanía XXVII, Villano teamed up with Lady Maravilla in a match for the AAA World Mixed Tag Team Championship. The team defeated Australian Suicide and Vanilla Vargas, Niño Hamburguesa and Big Mami and Sammy Guevara and Scarlett Bordeaux, to be crowned as new champions, Villano III Jr.'s first AAA championship. On October 19 at Héroes Inmortales XIII, Villano III Jr. along with Lady Maravilla had their first defense defeating Keyra and Látigo and her rivals Big Mami & Niño Hamburguesa.

Championships and accomplishments
Distrito Federal
Mexican State Tag Team Championship (1 time) – with El Hijo del Villano III
Mexican State Trios Championship (1 time) – with El Hijo del Villano III and Villano III
International Wrestling Revolution Group
Torneo FILL 58 – with Black Laser, Climax Jr., El Hijo del Villano III Jr., Kortiz, Máquina Infernal, Tackle, and Zhalon
Lucha Libre AAA Worldwide
AAA World Mixed Tag Team Championship (1 time) – with Lady Maravilla

Luchas de Apuestas record

References

1998 births
Living people
Mexican male professional wrestlers
Masked wrestlers
Professional wrestlers from Sinaloa
People from Mazatlán
Unidentified wrestlers
AAA World Mixed Tag Team Champions